Broad Appeal: Living with E's is a Canadian comedy web series, which premiered in 2020 on CBC Gem. The series stars Cathy Jones and Mary Walsh as Enid and Eulalia, their longtime sketch characters from This Hour Has 22 Minutes.

In the first season, Enid and Eulalia offered "pre-posthumous lifestyle advice", including their thoughts on the COVID-19 pandemic, while in the second season they undertake a train journey across Canada.

Walsh received a Canadian Screen Award nomination for Best Lead Performance in a Web Program or Series at the 10th Canadian Screen Awards in 2022.

Episodes

Season 1 (2017)

Season 2 (2020)

References

2020 web series debuts
Canadian comedy web series
CBC Gem original programming
2020s Canadian comedy television series